The Rack is the debut album by Asphyx. It was released in 1991 by Century Media Records.

Track listing

Personnel
Asphyx
 Martin van Drunen - vocals, bass guitar
 Eric Daniels - guitar
 Bob Bagchus - drums

Production
 Robert Kampf - Executive Producer
 Harry Wijering - Mixing, Producer
 Marion Wiggers - Photography
 Martin van Drunen - Lyrics
 Theo Loomans - Lyrics
 Axel Hermann - Cover art

References

Asphyx albums
1991 debut albums
Century Media Records albums